Pirate Falls Treasure Quest (previously known as Pirate Falls and Pirate Falls Dynamite Drench) is a log flume at Legoland Windsor, in the Pirate Shores (Formerly Wild Woods and Pirates Landing) area. It opened with the rest of the park in March 1996.

Description
After the boat leaves the station, it goes around a gentle stream. Along the stream there are Lego pirates that spray water at riders. The boat then turns into an area with a lake with water sporadically  blowing up into the air. The boat then passes through the pirates' graveyard and past a robotic parrot which tells riders to turn back. The boat then goes up the lift hill into a shack where a pirate lights a fuse. After a brief encounter with a vengeful pirate, an explosion sound goes off and the boat drops into the pool.

See also
 Log Flume
 Legoland Windsor
 Vikings' River Splash, another water ride at Legoland Windsor

References

External links
 

Legoland
Amusement rides introduced in 1996